List of A roads in zone 8 in Great Britain starting north of the A8 and west of the A9 (roads beginning with 8).

Single- and double-digit roads

Triple-digit roads

Four-digit roads

See also
 B roads in Zone 8 of the Great Britain numbering scheme
 List of motorways in the United Kingdom
 Transport in Glasgow#Other Roads
 Transport in Scotland#Road

 
8